Janne-Pekka Laine (born 25 January 2001) is a Finnish professional footballer, who plays as a midfielder for Finnish premier division club FC Haka.

References 

2001 births
Footballers from Tampere
Living people
Finnish footballers
Association football midfielders
FC Ilves players
FC Haka players
Veikkausliiga players
Kakkonen players